José Daniel Rivera Martínez (born 8 May 1997) is a Peruvian footballer who plays as a winger for Peruvian Primera División side Universitario de Deportes.

Career

Club career
Rivera made his way through the youth ranks of Unión Comercio and made his debut on 11 September 2016 against César Vallejo. He played a total of 22 league games in the 2016 and 2017 seasons. From the 2018 season, he became a regular player.

After 87 league appearances for Unión Comercio, he left the club at the end of the 2019 season to join Cusco FC, signing a deal until the end of 2021 in February 2020.

On 24 November 2021 it was confirmed, that Rivera would join Carlos A. Mannucci for the 2022 season.

International career
In May 2019, Rivera was called up for the Peruvian U23 national team to play the 2019 Pan American Games. He played one game and was on the bench in the remaining three games. In October 2019, he was called up once again, to the squad that was going to play in the 2020 CONMEBOL Pre-Olympic Tournament.

References

External links
 
 
 

Living people
1997 births
People from Tarapoto
Peruvian footballers
Peru international footballers
Peru youth international footballers
Association football wingers
Footballers at the 2019 Pan American Games
Peruvian Primera División players
Unión Comercio footballers
Cusco FC footballers
Carlos A. Mannucci players